St Ceinwen's Church, Llangeinwen, is a Grade II* listed building in Anglesey, north Wales.

The historic environment service of the Welsh government, Cadw, says that: 

Named for St Ceinwen, the church is located within an enclosed churchyard on the NW side of the A4080, 800m West of the village of Dwyran.

References

External links
 

Grade II* listed churches in Anglesey
Church in Wales church buildings